Charles Miller Sheaffer, Jr. (December 6, 1904 – August 28, 1989) was an American field hockey player who competed in the 1932 Summer Olympics and 1936 Summer Olympics.

He was born in St. Davids, Pennsylvania and died in Bryn Mawr, Pennsylvania.

In 1932, he was a member of the American field hockey team, which won the bronze medal. He played two matches as forward.

Four years later, he was a member of the American field hockey team, which lost all three matches in the preliminary round of the 1936 tournament and did not advance. He played three matches as forward.

External links
 
Profile

1904 births
1989 deaths
American male field hockey players
Field hockey players at the 1932 Summer Olympics
Field hockey players at the 1936 Summer Olympics
Olympic bronze medalists for the United States in field hockey
Medalists at the 1932 Summer Olympics